Kirkby Stephen is a railway station in Eden in Cumbria, England, on the Settle and Carlisle Line, which runs between  and  via .

History
The station was designed by the Midland Railway company architect John Holloway Sanders, and opened to traffic in May 1876.

It was opened as Kirkby Stephen, but it was renamed Kirkby Stephen and Ravenstonedale in 1900, and then Kirkby Stephen West in 1953, to avoid confusion with the older Kirkby Stephen, later known as Kirkby Stephen East, station in the town, on the North Eastern Railway's Stainmore and Eden Valley lines. Its remote location was necessitated by the Midland Railway's desire to keep gradients on the line to no greater than 1 in 100 for fast running. Had it been any closer to the town, the climb up to the summit of the line at Ais Gill would have exceeded this limit considerably. The West station reverted to the name Kirkby Stephen in 1968, but was closed (along with all other stations on the line except Settle and Appleby) in May 1970. It was reopened by British Rail in July 1986.

The station is leased by the Settle and Carlisle Railway Trust, which comprehensively restored it in 2009. The main buildings on platform 1 now incorporate a caretaker's flat, offices, holiday accommodation and the Midland Room, opened in July 2011, which includes a cafe and exhibition of items related to the Settle and Carlisle railway.  Platform 2 (northbound) has a stone shelter. The old goods shed to the south is now in private commercial use, goods facilities having been withdrawn here in 1964.

Step-free access to both platforms is available (ramps to platform 2 from the road below), along with a footbridge (erected in the mid-1990s after becoming redundant at its original location at ).  No ticket machine is present, so passengers must buy in advance or from the conductor on the train (though operator Northern is in the process of installing one and also digital information screens as part of a rolling station upgrade programme on the route).  Buses to and from the town call close to the station entrance on the A685 road to Kendal.

Stationmasters

Robinson Bell 1876 - 1882 
William Tunn 1882 - 1888 (afterwards station master at Fiskerton)
William George Nuttall 1888 - 1892 (formerly station master at Plumtree, afterwards station master at Appleby)
Thomas Moss 1892 -  1919 (formerly station master at Appleby)
E. Proctor 1919 - 1924 (afterwards station master at Bamford)

Services

A new early morning Monday to Friday service southbound began in May 2011. The first weekday northbound service now runs through from Leeds, rather than arriving from Carlisle and returning there after a reversal as before.

DalesRail services between Blackpool North/Preston and Carlisle also call at the station on summer Sundays.

References

External links

 
 

Railway stations in Cumbria
DfT Category F2 stations
Former Midland Railway stations
Railway stations in Great Britain opened in 1876
Railway stations in Great Britain closed in 1970
Railway stations in Great Britain opened in 1986
Reopened railway stations in Great Britain
Northern franchise railway stations
Beeching closures in England
John Holloway Sanders railway stations
Kirkby Stephen